In aerodynamics, the zero-lift drag coefficient  is a dimensionless parameter which relates an aircraft's zero-lift drag force to its size, speed, and flying altitude.

Thus, zero-lift drag coefficient is reflective of parasitic drag which makes it very useful in understanding how "clean" or streamlined an aircraft's aerodynamics are. For example, a Sopwith Camel biplane of World War I which had many wires and bracing struts as well as fixed landing gear, had a zero-lift drag coefficient of approximately 0.0378. Compare a  value of 0.0161 for the streamlined P-51 Mustang of World War II which compares very favorably even with the best modern aircraft.

The drag at zero-lift can be more easily conceptualized as the drag area which is simply the product of zero-lift drag coefficient and aircraft's wing area ( where  is the wing area). Parasitic drag experienced by an aircraft with a given drag area is approximately equal to the drag of a flat square disk with the same area which is held perpendicular to the direction of flight. Both aircraft have a similar wing area, again reflecting the Mustang's superior aerodynamics in spite of much larger size. In another comparison with the Camel, a very large but streamlined aircraft such as the Lockheed Constellation has a considerably smaller zero-lift drag coefficient (0.0211 vs. 0.0378) in spite of having a much larger drag area (34.82 ft2 vs. 8.73 ft2).

Furthermore, an aircraft's maximum speed is proportional to the cube root of the ratio of power to drag area, that is:

.

Estimating zero-lift drag
As noted earlier, .

The total drag coefficient can be estimated as:

,

where  is the propulsive efficiency, P is engine power in horsepower,  sea-level air density in slugs/cubic foot,  is the atmospheric density ratio for an altitude other than sea level, S is the aircraft's wing area in square feet, and V is the aircraft's speed in miles per hour.

.

The induced drag coefficient can be estimated as:

,

Substituting for  gives:

,

where W/S is the wing loading in lb/ft2.

References

Aerodynamics
Aircraft manufacturing
Drag (physics)